The Museu Barbier-Mueller d'Art Precolombí (its local name in Catalan; also known in , and in ) was the only museum in Europe devoted exclusively to the artistic legacy of the pre-Columbian cultures of the Americas. It was located in the Catalan capital of Barcelona, Spain. The museum was established in 1997 to house the pre-Columbian art collection formerly held by its parent museum, the Barbier-Mueller Museum in Genève, Switzerland, which was loaned to the city of Barcelona. In 2012, the museum was unable to reach a purchase agreement with the collection's owner Jean Paul Barbier-Mueller. Subsequently, the world's most important Pre-Columbian collection in private hands (according to El País) was split and auctioned at Southeby's on 22 March 2013.

References

External links
 , Catalog of the pieces sold at auction at Sotheby's in March 2013 which formerly constituted the museum's collection
 Barbier-Mueller Museum of Barcelona, Barbier-Mueller Museums collective website 
 Friends of the Barbier-Mueller Pre-Columbian Art Museum, details of exhibitions, publications, lectures and visitor information 
 Museu Barbier-Mueller d'Art Precolombí collection, notes on cultures represented with photos and information on selected art objects
 Museu Barbier-Mueller d’Art Precolombí in Barcelona (deutsch)

Museums in Barcelona
Museu Barbier-Mueller d'Art Precolombi
Art museums established in 1997
Mesoamerican art museums
Pre-Columbian art museums
Art museums and galleries in Catalonia
Museu Barbier-Mueller d'Art Precolombi
Archaeological museums in Catalonia